Richard Sutton (died 1634), of Lincoln's Inn and later of Acton, Middlesex, was an English politician and lawyer.

He was a Member (MP) of the Parliament of England for Newport, Isle of Wight in 1586 and for Newtown, Isle of Wight in 1589.

References

16th-century births
1634 deaths
Members of Lincoln's Inn
People from Acton, London
English MPs 1586–1587
English MPs 1589